RAI Amsterdam may refer to:

 RAI Amsterdam Convention Centre
 Amsterdam RAI railway station